Kajsa Anna-Karin Linnéa Ernst, (born 4 August 1962) is a Swedish actress. She started acting at the age of sixteen at Nöjesteatern in Malmö and studied at Teaterhögskolan in Malmö. After graduating she worked for ten years at Helsingborgs stadsteater. There she acted in several plays such as Byggmästare Solness, Spindelkvinnans kyss and Knäckebröd och hovmästarsås. In 1982 she danced balet at plays for Nils Poppe at Fredriksdalsteatern, and in 1990 she played a role in the play Två man och en änka at the same theater. She would appear in the filmatization of the play in 2013.

In 1998, Ernst moved to Stockholm. She made her film debut in Kjell Sundvalls In Bed with Santa in 1999, she has then moved on to act in films such as Miffo in 2003, Masjävlar in 2004 for which she won a Guldbagge award, and also in the film Järnets änglar.

Kajsa Ernst was married to actor and director Göran Stangertz from 2009 and until his death in 2012.

References

External links 

Living people
1962 births
Swedish actresses
Actors from Gothenburg